Air Scandic was an airline from Jersey, Channel Islands, operating charter flights for various UK tour operators, most of which operated out of Manchester Airport.

Fleet 

Over the years, Air Scandic operated the following aircraft types:

See also
 List of defunct airlines of the United Kingdom

References

External links

Defunct airlines of the United Kingdom